Gin house may refer to:

 Gin palace
 Gin gang